Ewa Janina Kłobukowska (born 1 October 1946) is a Polish former sprinter. She competed at the 1964 Olympics in the 4×100 m relay and 100 m sprint and won a gold and a bronze medal, respectively. She also won two gold and one silver medal at the 1966 European Athletics Championships. Kłobukowska set three world records, one in the 100 m (11.1 s, 9 July 1965 in Prague) and two in the 4×100 m relay (44.2 s, 13 September 1964, Łódź and 43.6 s, 21 October 1964, Tokyo). Kłobukowska was at one point considered to be the fastest woman in the world. The American Press made a statement, saying that nobody would beat Kłobukowska for the next 7-8 years following a race in Prague. Despite these successes and laurels, her records were annulled by the International Association of Athletics Federations (IAAF) after a gender identification test in 1967 wrongly labeled her as not female. The test procedures were later found to be inadequate.

Personal life
Kłobukowska was born in a family of intellectuals. In 1965, she graduated from a Technical School of Economics No. 6 and in 1972 from the SGH Warsaw School of Economics. She went on to work for a steel construction company called Energomontaż-Północ Gdynia. She then worked as an accountant in a Polish company in Czechoslovakia. In 1968, she became pregnant and bore a son.

Intersex condition
The gender test used for European Cup women's track and field competition in Kiev in 1967 wrongly identified her as not female, and Kłobukowska was subsequently banned from competing in professional sports. This was surprising considering she passed the nude gender verification test a year prior to this competition. According to the IAAF she had "one chromosome too many", likely referring to detection of a Y chromosome in some of her cells. However, had she had been tested one year later at the Mexico Olympics, she would have been eligible on the grounds that she was Barr Body (inactive X-chromosome), having a Barr Body in all of her cells. It is considered likely that this is the result of her having an XX/XXY genetic mosaic where some of her cells contain XX chromosomes, and other cells contain XXY, a rare intersex condition. Her humiliation led to a change in the gender verification policies by the International Olympic Committee, which from then on kept test results secret.

IAAF erased the three world records set by Kłobukowska, including the two team records in the 4×100 m relay. Even now, there are only a few articles on Kłobukowska because of the erasure of her accomplishments. Kłobukowska isn't seen in the public eye often because of the controversy. The reasoning behind this is that it has taken a significant toll on her mental health, almost resulting in suicide. As of 2017, she had still received no formal apology.

See also
Gender verification in sports
Caster Semenya
Maria José Martínez-Patiño
Dutee Chand
Santhi Soundarajan
Stanisława Walasiewicz
Helen Stephens
Irena Szewińska

References

External links

1946 births
Living people
Intersex sportspeople
Intersex women
Polish female sprinters
Olympic athletes of Poland
Athletes (track and field) at the 1964 Summer Olympics
Olympic gold medalists for Poland
Olympic bronze medalists for Poland
Athletes from Warsaw
Sex verification in sports
European Athletics Championships medalists
Medalists at the 1964 Summer Olympics
Olympic gold medalists in athletics (track and field)
Olympic bronze medalists in athletics (track and field)
Skra Warszawa athletes
Olympic female sprinters
SGH Warsaw School of Economics alumni